Hans Rosenberg (February 26, 1904–June 26, 1988) was a German refugee historian whose works influenced a whole generation of post-war German scholars.

Life
Rosenberg was born in Hannover. Though of Jewish ancestry, he was raised as a Protestant, in Cologne.  He took his PhD there in 1927 under Friedrich Meinecke, and received his Habilitation in 1932, despite strong conservative opposition. As the Great Depression unfolded, his attention shifted from the history of ideas and nationalism, which he studied under Meinecke, to economic cycles. The result of this was a 'stunningly original work' on the world economic crisis of 1857–1859, published in Stuttgart in 1934.

Neither Rosenberg nor his wife Helen (a promising concert pianist) seemed likely to secure a good career in Germany, due to a variety of factors including faculty politics at Cologne, as well as the rise of Nazism and his Jewish ancestry. They were forced into exile and he became one of many refugee historians. He endeavoured to obtain employment, without success, in England, before finally emigrating to the United States in 1935. He taught briefly at Illinois College before taking a position at Brooklyn College, where he was to teach undergraduates for 23 years. Among his most distinguished pupils there was Raul Hilberg. His work identified in the power structures and social relations of agrarian society in Prussia the roots of the authoritarian and undemocratic character of what he, with others, took to be the Sonderweg, or special path of modern German history.

He taught briefly, for a year (1949–1950) at the Free University of Berlin, and then at Marburg in 1955. His influence on the young generation of German historians has led to the claim he was the father of modern social history (Gesellschaftsgeschichte) in post-war Germany. From 1959 to 1972 he taught at Berkeley and crowned his career as Shepard Professor Emeritus. To this period is dated his classic work,  which he reworked for his classic The Great Depression of 1873-1896 in Central Europe (Grosse Depression und Bismarckzeit, 1967). He retired in 1972, and returned for personal reasons to Germany in 1977, settling in Kirchzarten near the University of Freiburg, where he had been appointed Honorary Professor the year before. He was awarded the Bundesverdienstkreuz, Ist class by the Federal Republic in 1979.

He died in Freiburg im Breisgau in 1988, aged 84.

Works
Die Weltwirtschaftskrise von 1857–1859, Stuttgart 1934
Grosse Depression und Bismarckzeit. Wirtschaftsablauf, Gesellschaft und Politik in Mitteleuropa, Berlin 1967
Bureaucracy, aristocracy, and autocracy: the Prussian experience, 1660–1815, Cambridge Massachusetts, (1958) Beacon Press 2nd.ed.,1966

Secondary Literature
Georg G. Iggers,'Refugee Historians from Nazi Germany:Political Attitudes towards Democracy,' Monna and Otto Weinmann Lecture Series, 14 September 2005 
Morton Rothstein, "'Drunk on Ideas': Hans Rosenberg as a Teacher at Brooklyn College," Central European History (1991), 24 pp 64–68 Cambridge University Press
Hanna Schissler, 'Explaining History: Hans Rosenberg'  in Lehmann Hartmut and James J. Sheehan (eds.) An Interrupted Past: German-Speaking Refugee Historians in the United States After 1933, Cambridge University Press,2002 ch.13 pp. 180–187.
Shulamit Volkov, 'Hans Rosenberg as a teacher: A Few Personal Notes,' 1991 Conference Group for Central European History of the American Historical Association. Pp. 58ff.

References

Jewish emigrants from Nazi Germany to the United States
Academic staff of the University of Marburg
20th-century German historians
German Protestants
Officers Crosses of the Order of Merit of the Federal Republic of Germany
1904 births
1988 deaths
20th-century American historians
German male non-fiction writers
20th-century American male writers
American male non-fiction writers
Brooklyn College faculty
University of California, Berkeley faculty